Michael James Laracy (20 October 1871 – 25 April 1952) was a New Zealand shearer and trade unionist. He was born in Avoca, Victoria, Australia on 20 October 1871.

References

1871 births
1952 deaths
New Zealand trade unionists
Australian emigrants to New Zealand
New Zealand sheep shearers